Baron Deramore, of Belvoir in the County of Down, is a title in the Peerage of the United Kingdom. It was created on 18 November 1885 for the Conservative Member of Parliament Sir Thomas Bateson, 2nd Baronet. His father Thomas Bateson had been created a baronet, of Belvoir Park in the County of Down, on 18 December 1818 in the Baronetage of the United Kingdom. The barony was created with special remainder to the first Baron's younger brother George, who succeeded him as second Baron.

He was the husband of Mary Elizabeth de Yarburgh (died  1884), daughter and heiress of George John de Yarburgh, of Heslington Hall, near York, and assumed in 1876 by Royal licence the additional surname of de Yarburgh after the death of his father-in-law. In 1892 Lord Deramore assumed the surname of Bateson after, instead of before that of de Yarburgh. He was succeeded by his son, the third Baron. He served as Lord-Lieutenant of the East Riding of Yorkshire from 1924 to 1936. On his death the titles passed to his younger brother, the fourth Baron.

The family seat of Heslington Hall was acquired by the University of York in 1962 and now forms part of its campus. The Hall was lived in by the family of the Barons Deramore until ca 1940, when it was vacated in favour of No. 4 Group RAF.

Bateson baronets, of Belvoir Park (1818)
Sir Robert Bateson, 1st Baronet (1782–1863)
Sir Thomas Bateson, 2nd Baronet (1819-1890) (created Baron Deramore in 1885)

Barons Deramore (1885)
Thomas Bateson, 1st Baron Deramore (1819–1890)
George William de Yarburgh-Bateson, 2nd Baron Deramore (1823–1893)
Robert Wilfrid de Yarburgh-Bateson, 3rd Baron Deramore (1865–1936)
George de Yarburgh-Bateson, 4th Baron Deramore (1870–1943)
Stephen de Yarburgh-Bateson, 5th Baron Deramore (1903–1964)
Richard Arthur de Yarburgh-Bateson, 6th Baron Deramore (1911–2006)

Notes

References 

Kidd, Charles, Williamson, David (editors). Debrett's Peerage and Baronetage (1990 edition). New York: St Martin's Press, 1990, 

Noble titles created in 1885
Noble titles created for UK MPs
Peerages created with special remainders
Baronies in the Peerage of the United Kingdom